NALD may refer to:

 Neonatal adrenoleukodystrophy
 Non-alcoholic liver disease
 PEX10, peroxisome gene
 PEX13, peroxisome gene